"Think About You" is a song by American singer Luther Vandross. It was written by James Porte and Vandross for his thirteenth studio album, Dance with My Father (2003), with production helmed by the latter. "Think About You" was a minor hit after its single release, and would later peak at number 29 on the US Billboard Hot R&B/Hip-Hop Songs chart, while also reaching the top of the Adult R&B Songs chart.

Track listing
US CD single

Charts

References

2003 songs
2003 singles
Luther Vandross songs
Songs written by Luther Vandross
J Records singles